Boyeria is a genus of dragonfly in the family Aeshnidae, commonly called spotted darners. They occur in temperate North America and Eurasia.

The name Boyeria commemorates the French entomologist Etienne Laurent Joseph Hippolyte Boyer de Fonscolombe
 
The genus contains the following seven described species:
Boyeria cretensis  – Cretan spectre
Boyeria grafiana  – ocellated darner
Boyeria irene  – western spectre
Boyeria jamjari 
Boyeria karubei 
Boyeria maclachlani 
Boyeria sinensis 
Boyeria vinosa  – fawn darner

References

Aeshnidae
Anisoptera genera
Taxa named by Robert McLachlan (entomologist)
Taxonomy articles created by Polbot